Stéphanie Borchers (born 3 May 1989) is a German professional racing cyclist. She rides for the Feminine Cycling Team.

See also
 List of 2015 UCI Women's Teams and riders

References

External links

1989 births
Living people
German female cyclists
Place of birth missing (living people)